The Kobe Regatta & Athletic Club is Japan's oldest sports club, founded September 23, 1870 by Alexander Cameron Sim.  The Club moved to a newly manufactured building at the end of 1870 and held its first-ever regatta on December 24, of that same year.  The Club and its members introduced Association Football, Field Hockey, Cricket, Rugby, the Crawl (swimming) and Ten-Pin bowling to Japan

Association Football was introduced in to the club in 1888 and the first official football match in Japan was held on February 18, 1888 between the KR&AC and its Yokohama counterpart, the Yokohama Country & Athletic Club.

References

External links
 Kobe Regatta & Athletic Club Official Website

Multi-sport clubs in Japan
Sports clubs established in 1870
Sport in Kobe